The 1918 Primera División was the 18th season of Uruguay's top-flight football league.

Overview
The tournament consisted of a two-wheel championship of all against all. It involved ten teams, and the champion was Peñarol, winning the first championship under that name and sixth if considered as a successor of Central Uruguay Railway Cricket Club.

Teams

League standings

Notes

References 

Uruguayan Primera División seasons
Uru
1